UIE may refer to:

 United in Europe, political party in the UK
 Union of Economic Interests, political party in Portugal
 Unidentified infrared emission, in astronomy
 UNESCO Institute for Education, one of six educational institutes of UNESCO
 User interface engineering, the design of user interfaces for machines and software
 Union Internationale des Étudiants, International University Sports Federation